The UNC Greensboro Spartans men's soccer team is the varsity intercollegiate athletic team of University of North Carolina at Greensboro in Greensboro, North Carolina, United States. The team is a member of the Southern Conference, which is part of the National Collegiate Athletic Association's Division I. UNCG's first men's soccer team was fielded in 1971. The team plays its home games at UNCG Soccer Stadium in Greensboro. The UNCG Spartans have a three pronged coaching system run by head coach Chris Rich (2019) and assistant coaches Garrett McLaughlin(2018) and Jaime Ibarra(2019)

Historically, UNCG has been one of the most successful college soccer teams in North Carolina. In the 1980s, UNCG, while still playing in NCAA Division III, won five NCAA Division III Men's Soccer Championships. In the mid-2000s, the Spartans reached three Sweet Sixteens in the NCAA Division I Men's Soccer Tournament. In the late 2000s and early 2010s, the program had several NCAA violations that caused the program to forfeit several losses; In addition to the losses, the program also suffered the loss of their head coach at the time, a fine of $5,000 payable to the NCAA, and  significant recruitment and recruitment communications suspensions.

Individual honors 

Third team All-Americans

Team honors

NCAA Division I honors 
 Big South Conference
 Regular season (4): 1993, 1994, 1995, 1996
 Tournament (3):  1993, 1994, 1996
 Southern Conference
 Regular season (8): 1997, 1998, 2004, 2005, 2006, 2010, 2011, 2015
 Tournament (6): 1998, 2004, 2005, 2006, 2008, 2010

NCAA Division II honors 
 NCAA Division II Men's Soccer Tournament
 Winners (5): 1982, 1983, 1985, 1986, 1987
 Runners-up (1): 1989
 Dixie Conference
 Regular season (7): 1981, 1982, 1983, 1984, 1985, 1986, 1987
 Tournament (6): 1981, 1982, 1983, 1984, 1985, 1986

References

External links 
 

 
1971 establishments in North Carolina
Association football clubs established in 1971